The 2023 Copa CONMEBOL Libertadores Femenina will be the 15th edition of the CONMEBOL Libertadores Femenina (also referred to as the Copa Libertadores Femenina), South America's premier women's club football tournament organized by CONMEBOL. The tournament will be held in Colombia from 5 to 21 October 2023.

Palmeiras are the defending champions.

Teams

The 16 teams are:
the champions of all ten CONMEBOL associations
the title holders
an additional team from the host association
four additional teams from associations with the best historical performance in the tournament (associations in bold receive two berths according to the points total until the 2022 edition). Until the 2021 edition the ranking was:
Brazil: 240 points
Chile: 140 points
Colombia: 135 points
Paraguay: 112 points
Argentina: 90 points
Venezuela: 78 points
Ecuador: 62 points
Uruguay: 52 points
Bolivia: 39 points
Peru: 37 points

Notes

See also
2022–23 UEFA Women's Champions League
2023 Copa Libertadores

References

2023
2023 in women's association football
2023 in South American football
International club association football competitions hosted by Colombia